Elvia glaucata is the only species in the monotypic moth genus Elvia of the family Geometridae. It is found in New Zealand. Both the genus and the species were first described by Francis Walker in 1862.

References

Geometridae
Taxa named by Francis Walker (entomologist)